"Go-On" is a Japanese-language song by Uverworld. It is the band's 13th single and was released on 5 August 2009. GO-ON is the 2nd ending theme of the drama, Dr. House. Go-On's Oricon Weekly Ranking is #2 and sold a total of 53k copies which is a little more than 恋いしくて which is a non tie-up. Despite this, the single was well received by fans and pretty much a solid single itself. The limited edition and regular comes with one of the 4 different stickers.

Track listing

CD 
 "Go-On"
 "The Truth"

DVD 
 Uverworld Classics Vol.1 Prime: The Jump Clips
 Uverworld 2009 Trailer

Personnel 
 TAKUYA∞ - vocals, rap, programming
 Katsuya - guitar, programming
 Akira - guitar, programming
 Nobuto - bass guitar
 Shintarou - drums

2009 singles
Uverworld songs
2009 songs
Gr8! Records singles